Robert Loret (11 July 1892 – 27 October 1950) was a French racing cyclist. He rode in the 1924 Tour de France.

References

1892 births
1950 deaths
French male cyclists
Place of birth missing